Bhama Rukmani is a 1980 Indian Tamil-language drama film directed by R. Bhaskaran. The film stars K. Bhagyaraj, Raadhika and Praveena. It was released on 12 June 1980.

Plot
Nandagopal (K. Bhagyaraj) has been in love with Rukmani (Praveena Bhagyaraj) since they were in school together. His mother wants him to marry his cousin Bhama (Raadhika). He tells his mother about his love but she points out that Bhama's father, Ezhumalai (K. A. Thangavelu) had offered sanctuary to them when he was younger. Nandagopal is also working for Ezhumalai currently and they owe a debt of gratitude. She threatens to commit suicide if he does not agree to this marriage. A guilt-ridden Nandhagopal accepts and is quickly married to Bhama though Rukmani is kept in the dark. Worried that Rukmani will commit suicide if she learns the truth, Nandhagopal also marries her. Both women and the families learn the truth very soon and Nandagopal finds himself thrown out of both homes. He turns to his best friend, lawyer Seshadhri (Nagesh) to find a solution to his problem. Seshu comes up with increasingly outlandish and comic schemes that fail spectacularly.

Cast
 K. Bhagyaraj as Nandagopal
 Raadhika as Bhama
Praveena Bhagyaraj as Rukmani 
 Nagesh as Seshadhri
 K. A. Thangavelu as Ezhumalai
Ganthimathi as Aandal
Kallapetti Singaram
Usilai Mani
 Y. G. Mahendra (Guest Appearance) as Mounaguru
 Jayamala (Guest Appearance) as Cabaret Girl
 Lakshmi Narayan
 Chandran Babu
 Sundari Bhai

Soundtrack
The music was composed by M. S. Viswanathan, while the lyrics were written by Muthulingam and Chidambaranathan.

References

1980 films
1980s Tamil-language films
Indian drama films
Films scored by M. S. Viswanathan
Films with screenplays by K. Bhagyaraj